2C-YN is an analog of phenethylamine that can be synthesized from 2C-I.  Very little data exists about the pharmacological properties, metabolism, and toxicity of 2C-YN, although Daniel Trachsel lists it as having a dosage of around 50mg and a duration of around 2 hours, with relatively mild psychedelic effects.

Legality

Canada
As of October 31st, 2016; 2C-YN is a controlled substance (Schedule III) in Canada. http://gazette.gc.ca/rp-pr/p2/2016/2016-05-04/html/sor-dors72-eng.php

See also
 2C-AL
 2C-E
 2C-cP
 2C-V

References

2C (psychedelics)
Ethynyl compounds